Richard Pryor: Live & Smokin' is a 1971 American stand-up comedy concert film directed by Michael Blum, who also cinematographer and producer. The film stars Richard Pryor, who also wrote. Filmed in New York City in early January 1971, it is the earliest Pryor stand-up comedy act to be filmed of the four that were released. This was Pryor's first stand-up act before he reached the mainstream audience; with only 48 minutes of footage, it is also the shortest of his stand-up routines.

References

External links
 

1971 films
1971 comedy films
African-American comedy films
American comedy films
Films set in New York City
Films with screenplays by Richard Pryor
Richard Pryor
Stand-up comedy concert films
1970s English-language films
1970s American films